Murray is a masculine given name. It may refer to:

Arts and entertainment

Acting
F. Murray Abraham (born 1939), American actor
Murray Alper (1904–1984), American actor
Murray Bartlett (born 1971), Australian actor
Murray Hamilton (1923–1986), American actor
Murray Head (born 1946), English singer and actor
Murray Cruchley, Canadian actor and radio personality active 1979–1995
 Murray Langston (born 1944), Canadian/American actor and comedian known as The Unknown Comic

Music
Murray Adaskin (1906–2002), Canadian violinist, composer, conductor and teacher
Murray C. Anderson, South African composer, recording engineer and producer
Murray Attaway (born 1957), American musician
Murray Bernthal (1911–2010), American musician and producer
Murray Boren (born 1950), American composer
Murray Cook (born 1960), Australian vocalist, songwriter and guitarist with The Wiggles
Murray Gold (born 1969), English composer, known for composing music for Doctor Who
Murray Head (born 1946), English singer and actor
Murray Kaufman a.k.a. Murray the K (1922–1982), American disc jockey
Murray Perahia (born 1947), American conductor and pianist
Murray Cutter (1902–1983), French-American orchestrator

Other arts and entertainment
Murray Ball (1939–2017), New Zealand cartoonist
Murray Lerner (1927–2017), American documentary filmmaker
Murray SawChuck (born 1973), magician on America's Got Talent (season 5) and magic expert for Pawn Stars
Murray Smith (writer) (1940–2003), British TV writer and producer
Murray Chercover (1929–2010), Canadian television producer and executive
Murray Cohl (1929–2008), Canadian film producer
Murray (escapologist), born Norman Murray Walters (1901–1988), Australian escapologist

Business
Murray M. Baker (1872–1964), American businessman
Murray Lender (1930–2012), American businessman

Education
Murray Bowen (1913–1990), American psychiatrist and professor
Murray Brown (born 1936), Economics professor
Murray Barnson Emeneau (1904–2005), American linguistics professor
Murray S Smith, British professor of film studies and philosopher at the University of Kent
Murray A. Straus (1926–2016), American professor of sociology
Murray C. Wells (born 1936), New Zealand economist and professor
Murray Clarke, Canadian Philosophy professor

Politics
Murray Biggar, Canadian politician in office 1895
Murray Bourchier (1881–1937), Australian soldier and politician
Murray Bourchier (diplomat) (1925–1981), Australian public servant and diplomat
Murray Byrne (1928–2012), Australian politician
Murray Calder (born 1951), Canadian politician
Murray Gaunt (1935–2009), Canadian politician, 1962–1981
Murray McBride (born 1935), Canadian politician and author
Murray McCully (born 1953), New Zealand politician
Murray Schwartz (Queens politician) (1919–2001), American politician
Murray Smith (Alberta politician), Canadian lawyer and politician, 1993–2004
Murray Smith (Canadian politician) (1930–2010), MP for Winnipeg North, 1958–1962
Murray Smith (New Zealand politician), in office 2002–2005
Murray Robert Smith (1941–2009), New Zealand Labour Party politician & MP
Robert Murray Smith (1831–1921), known as Murray Smith, politician in colonial Victoria, Australia
Murray Cardiff (1934–2013), Canadian MP in office 1980–1993
Murray Chotiner (1909–1974), American political strategist, attorney, and government official
Murray Clark (1899–1973), Canadian parliament member in office 1935–1957
Murray Coell (born 1955 or 1954), Canadian politician in office 1996–2013
Murray Cowper (born 1960), Australian politician in office 2005–2017
Murray Criddle (born 1943), Australian politician in office 1993–2008
Murray Van Wagoner (1898–1986), American politician from Michigan

Science and medicine
Murray Banks (1917–2008), American psychologist
Murray Barr (1908–1995), Canadian physician and medical researcher
Murray Batchelor (born 1961), Australian mathematical physicist
Murray Bornstein (1917–1995), American neuroscientist
Murray Bowen (1913–1990), American psychiatrist and professor
Murray Brennan (born 1940), New Zealand surgeon, oncologist, cancer researcher, and academic
Ian Brooker (1934–2016), Australian botanist
Murray Campbell, Canadian computer scientist involved with IBM Deep Blue
Murray Gell-Mann (1929–2019), Nobel prize–winning theoretical physicist
Murray Goldberg (born 1962), Canadian eLearning pioneer
Murray Feingold (1930-2015), American pediatrician and geneticist, founder of the National Birth Defects Center (now Feingold Center for Children)

Sports

Association football
Murray Archibald (1917–2006), Scottish footballer
Murray Barnes (1954–2011), Australian soccer player
Murray Brodie (born 1950), Scottish footballer

Cricket
Murray Bennett (born 1956), Australian cricketer
Murray Bisset (1876–1931), South African cricketer
Murray Brown (umpire) (born 1966), South African cricket umpire
Murray Chapple (1930–1985), New Zealand cricketer
Murray Child (born 1953), New Zealand cricketer
Murray Commins (born 1997), South African cricketer
Murray Creed (born 1979), South African cricketer active 1997–2002

Ice hockey
Murray Anderson (ice hockey) (born 1949), Canadian player
Murray Armstrong (1916–2010), Canadian player and coach
Murray Balagus (born 1929), Canadian player
Murray Balfour (1936–1965), American player
Murray Bannerman (born 1957), Canadian player
Murray Baron (born 1967), Canadian player
Murray Brumwell (born 1960), Canadian player
Murray McIntosh (born 1967), Canadian player
Murray Costello (born 1934), Canadian player, executive, administrator, and builder
Murray Craven (born 1964), Canadian centre

Other sports
Murray Anderson (field hockey) (born 1968), South African field hockey player
Murray Arnold (1938–2012), American basketball coach
Murray Ashby (1931–1990), New Zealand rower
Murray Bedel, Canadian para–alpine skier at the 1984 Winter Paralympics
Murray Browne (born 1963), Australian rules football player
Murray Buchan (born 1991), Scottish freestyle skier
Murray Burdan (born 1975), New Zealand swimmer
Murray Buswell (born 1962), English swimmer
Murray Carter (born 1931), Australian racing driver
Murray Cheater (born 1947), New Zealand hammer thrower
Murray Chessell (born 1944), Australian lawyer and gymnast
Murray Clapham (1939–2011), Australian rules footballer
Murray Cockburn (born 1933), Canadian sprinter
Murray Cook (baseball) (born 1940), Canadian scout and general manager
Murray Couper (born 1948), Australian rules football player
Murray Craig, Scottish rugby union player active in the 1990s and 2000s
Murray Deaker, New Zealand sports broadcaster
Murray Mexted (born 1953), New Zealand rugby union player
Murray Walker (1923–2021), English motorsport commentator and pundit

Writing
Murray Bail (born 1941), Australian author
Murray Bishoff, American writer active in the late 20th century
Murray Boltinoff (1911–1994), American writer and editor of comic books
Murray Cammick, New Zealand journalist, photographer and record label founder active since the 1970s
Murray Campbell (columnist) (born 1950), Canadian columnist
Murray Chass (born 1938), American sports writer
Murray Kempton (1917–1997), American journalist
Murray Leinster (1896–1975), American author
Murray McBride (born 1935), Canadian politician and author
Murray Rothbard (1926–1995), American economist, individualist anarchist, and author
Murray Sayle (1926–2010), Australian journalist

Other
Murray Adams-Acton (1886–1971), English historian and interior designer
Murray Angus, Canadian First Nations activist
Murray Arbeid (1935–2011), British fashion designer
Murray Beauclerk, 14th Duke of St Albans (born 1939)
Murray Bookchin (1921–2006), American political theorist, creator of the theory of social ecology
Murray Chandler (born 1960), New Zealand chess grandmaster
Murray Chatlain (born 1963), Canadian clergyman
Murray Cotterill (1913–1995), Canadian trade union activist
Murray Coutts-Trotter (1874–1929), British barrister and Chief Justice of the Madras High Court
Murray Gerstenhaber (born 1927), American mathematician and lawyer
Murray A. Hansen, American military officer
Murray Beresford Roberts (1919–1974), Australian–New Zealand confidence trickster and thief
Murray Merle Schwartz (1931–2013), American federal judge from Delaware
Murray J. Shubin (1917–1956), American World War II flying ace
Murray A. Wiener (1909–????), American explorer and photographer

English masculine given names